Sabitzer is a surname. Notable people with the surname include:

Herfried Sabitzer (born 1969), Austrian footballer
Marcel Sabitzer (born 1994), Austrian footballer
Thomas Sabitzer (born 2000), Austrian footballer